Glenn Cyril Hunter (born 1967) is a former Crusaders footballer and held the club's goalscoring record with 157 goals in 296 appearances, breaking the record of Curry Mulholland, which had stood for almost 40 years before being surpassed by Jordan Owens in January 2016.

He won two league championships with the Hatchetmen, scoring a memorable diving header in 1995 against Ballymena United, that clinched the first of these titles. Glenn also played for other clubs, such as Linfield, Ballymena United and Lisburn Distillery.

Later in his career, he started managing Lisburn Distillery's reserve team. He scored around 350 goals in total in his footballing career.

References 

1967 births
Living people
Association footballers from Northern Ireland
Crusaders F.C. players
Lisburn Distillery F.C. players
NIFL Premiership players
Association football forwards